Pedro Francisco Bonó y Mejía (October 18, 1828 – September 13, 1906) was a Dominican politician, sociologist and intellectual. He is credited with being the first Dominican sociologist. He was the president of the Senate of the Dominican Republic in 1858.

Bonó was born in 1828, to Joseph Bonó (a ranchman and trader of Italian origin) and Inés Mejía y Port. His maternal grandmother, Doña Eugénie Port, a native of Brittany (North-Western France) who had large plantations and fortune in the Saint-Domingue until the outbreak of the Haitian Revolution, taught him the French language and fashioned him intellectually.

A metro station in Santo Domingo is named after him.

Publications 
 El Montero (1856)
 Apuntes para los Cuatro Ministerios de la República (1857)
 Apuntes sobre las Clases Trabajadoras Dominicanas (1881)
 Congreso Extraparlamentario (1895)
 Epistolario
 Ensayos Sociohistóricos
 Actuación Pública
 Papeles de Pedro Francisco Bonó (Works collected by Emilio Rodríguez Demorizi, 1963)

References 

1828 births
1906 deaths
Presidents of the Senate of the Dominican Republic
People from Santiago Province (Dominican Republic)
Dominican Republic people of Breton descent
Dominican Republic people of Italian descent